This is a list of listed buildings in Scotland. The list is split out by council area.

 List of listed buildings in Aberdeen
 List of listed buildings in Aberdeenshire
 List of listed buildings in Angus
 List of listed buildings in Argyll and Bute
 List of listed buildings in Clackmannanshire
 List of listed buildings in Dumfries and Galloway
 List of listed buildings in Dundee
 List of listed buildings in East Ayrshire
 List of listed buildings in East Dunbartonshire
 List of listed buildings in East Lothian
 List of listed buildings in East Renfrewshire
 List of listed buildings in Edinburgh
 List of listed buildings in Falkirk (council area)
 List of listed buildings in Fife
 List of listed buildings in Glasgow
 List of listed buildings in Highland
 List of listed buildings in Inverclyde
 List of listed buildings in Midlothian
 List of listed buildings in Moray
 List of listed buildings in North Ayrshire
 List of listed buildings in North Lanarkshire
 List of listed buildings in Orkney Islands
 List of listed buildings in the Outer Hebrides
 List of listed buildings in Perth and Kinross
 List of listed buildings in Renfrewshire
 List of listed buildings in Scottish Borders
 List of listed buildings in Shetland Islands
 List of listed buildings in South Ayrshire
 List of listed buildings in South Lanarkshire
 List of listed buildings in Stirling
 List of listed buildings in West Dunbartonshire
 List of listed buildings in West Lothian

See also
 Listed buildings in Scotland, includes a list of lists of Category A listed buildings

 
listed buildings
listed buildings